These are the results of the men's K-2 1000 metres competition in canoeing at the 1952 Summer Olympics. The K-2 event is raced by two-man canoe sprint kayaks. Heats and final took place on July 28.

Medalists

Heats
The 19 teams first raced in three heats.  The top three teams in each heat advanced directly to the final.

Final

The Finnish duo won the gold medal after studying a photo finish of the event.

References

1952 Summer Olympics official report. p. 632.
Sports-Reference.com 1952 K-2 1000 m results.
Wallechinsky, David and Jaime Loucky (2008). "Canoeing: Men's Kayak Pairs: 1000 Meters". In The Complete Book of the Olympics: 2008 Edition. London: Aurum Press, Limited. p. 475.

Men's K-2 1000
Men's events at the 1952 Summer Olympics